"All the Small Things" is a song by American rock band Blink-182. It was the second single and eighth track released from the band's third album, Enema of the State (1999). The track was composed primarily by guitarist and vocalist Tom DeLonge as an ode to his then girlfriend. Recorded in Los Angeles with producer Jerry Finn, the song was created with the intention of shipping it to radio, as the trio felt they needed a single "really catchy and basic."

The single was released to radio on September 28, 1999, and promptly charted worldwide, becoming a number one hit on Billboard's Modern Rock Tracks chart, peaking at number two on the UK Singles Chart, and crossing over to pop radio and peaking at number six on the Billboard Hot 100. The song remains the band's most successful single to date, being their only song to break the Top 40. The song charted within the top 20 in ten other countries, and gained greater significance due to its accompanying music video, which parodies and mocks the boy bands Backstreet Boys, 98 Degrees, and 'N Sync and the pop singers Britney Spears and Christina Aguilera. The video was popular in rotation on MTV's Total Request Live, leading to criticism from those who felt their basis for parody was thin.

"All the Small Things" was selected by Rolling Stone as one of the "100 Greatest Pop Songs", and is listed in the 2010 book 1001 Songs You Must Hear Before You Die.

Background

"All the Small Things" can be traced back to when the trio first began writing songs for Enema of the State at DML Studios. DeLonge had just bought his first home in San Diego, and bought two to three thousand dollars worth of foam padding to insulate his room. By this point, most of the tracks present on Enema of the State had been written, but DeLonge felt the album needed "just one song that was really catchy and basic." "I remember thinking, 'The label's gonna want a song for the radio – so here's one,'" said DeLonge. "It was obvious from the beginning it would fit that format." DeLonge had wanted to write a track including "na na na's" as an ode to one of his favorite bands, the Ramones. Additionally, in an interview, DeLonge remarked, "I put 'na na's' in it, because I couldn't think of any words, you know?", to explain this lyrical decision. Early demos listed it as "Ramones-style song", and the original working title of the track was "Babycakes-Buttermuffin".

DeLonge wrote the track about Jennifer Jenkins, his longtime girlfriend since high school whom he would eventually marry. The lyrics "She left me roses by the stairs / Surprises let me know she cares" are based on an incident in which Jenkins left roses on the stairs after DeLonge returned home late from recording. The guitar riff for the song cycles around chords C major, F and G (I, IV and V in C), a familiar chord progression. The texture on the track is due to several overdubs playing various inversions and extensions of the main chords. The bass guitar stays on C while the guitars move to F, creating a 2nd inversion chord. "It was one of the last songs we recorded," DeLonge told Kerrang!, "because it was simple it wasn't that much fun to play. But once we put it all together and played it as a band we all looked at each other and said, 'This song's huge!'"

Reception
Q called the song "one of those power-pop tunes that the Americans get soooo right," joking, "[it] has more hooks than the Fishing Channel." The Rolling Stone Album Guide dubbed it the band's "most subtle song about sex," calling it one of the album's classic singles. It was labeled "a pop punk watershed" by Jonah Weiner of Blender in 2004.

Accolades
The song proved influential on the pop punk genre, with a host of young musicians emulating its sound. "It blended punk attitude with pop songwriting so much better than other bands," said Simple Plan bassist David Desrosiers.

* denotes an unordered list

Chart performance
The single debuted at number 89 on the Billboard Hot 100 chart for the week of December 4, 1999 and eventually peaked at number six, the highest Blink-182 has received on that chart.   The song also reached number one on the Billboard Modern Rock Tracks.  The song also achieved massive success in other countries, most notably in the United Kingdom, where it entered and peaked at number two on the UK Singles Chart in March 2000, beaten to the top of the chart by "Bag It Up" by Geri Halliwell. "All the Small Things" has since sold 1,200,000 copies in the UK and been certified double Platinum. In Australia, "All the Small Things" peaked at number eight on the ARIA Singles Chart. The single was certified Platinum by the Australian Recording Industry Association. It was one of the top-selling singles in America in 2000, with Nielsen SoundScan estimating its sales at 500,000 copies. The song has accumulated over 500,000 plays on US pop radio as of December 2011.

Music video
The music video for "All the Small Things" was directed by Marcos Siega, and mocks boy bands and contemporary pop videos. It features the trio doing parodies of other popular boy-bands such as Backstreet Boys (most famously the "I Want It That Way" video), 98 Degrees, and NSYNC. The video also features parodies of Britney Spears' "Sometimes", and Christina Aguilera's "Genie in a Bottle" video. It became the most successful video from Enema of the State, and its constant airplay on MTV cemented the band's image as video stars. The music video was shot on location from August 5–6 at Van Nuys Airport and Santa Monica State Beach. It premiered September 20, 1999, on MTV's Making the Video. The video was a major success on MTV's Total Request Live (TRL), where it was retired after 65 days on the countdown.

The video was named "Best Video" at the 2000 Kerrang! Awards, as well as nabbing "Best Group Video" at the 2000 MTV Video Music Awards. "I was a little surprised it went over so well," recalled Marcos Siega, director of the clip, commenting that he felt it would offend viewers of TRL and boy band fans. "I think we had the opposite effect. In some ways, I think that video put Blink at that sort of pop level with those other bands. We were making fun of them, but it kind of became [what it was making fun of]." "Blink now had the backing of a major record company […] just like the synthesized pop acts they were spoofing," said British journalist Tim Footman. "In what way were they less 'pop' than Sugar Ray and 98 Degrees?" Matt Diehl, author of the book My So-Called Punk, called the basis for satire thin: "To seasoned ears, Blink-182 sounded and looked just as manufactured as the pop idols they were poking fun at." In a similar vein, in 2011, The New York Times wrote, "Fame doesn’t discriminate based on origin, though: soon the group was as famous as those it was parodying."

During rehearsals for the video, bassist and vocalist Mark Hoppus met his future wife, Skye Everly. According to a 2004 interview, Everly, who was then an MTV talent executive, initially said no to dating Hoppus: "Tom [DeLonge] always used to embarrass me. Any girl he'd talk to, he'd say, 'Hey, you wanna go on a date with Mark?' He asked Skye [Everly], my wife, who looked at me and said 'No.' That's how it all started." Hoppus married Everly on December 2, 2000.

Track listings

All live tracks on the UK release were recorded at the Electric Ballroom, London, England, on November 30, 1999.

Personnel
 Tom Delonge – lead vocals, guitars
 Mark Hoppus – bass, backing vocals
 Travis Barker – drums
 Roger Joseph Manning, Jr. – keyboards

Charts

Weekly charts

Year-end charts

Certifications

Release history

Jedward version

"All the Small Things" served as the second single from Irish pop rap duo Jedward's debut studio album, Planet Jedward. The single was released on July 16, 2010. The song performed relatively modestly, peaking at number 21 on the Irish Charts and at number 6 on the UK Indie Chart.

Music video
The music video for "All The Small Things" premiered on YouTube on July 15, 2010. The video was filmed in June 2010. The video is inspired by the original video by Blink-182, parodying popular music videos that have been seen worldwide. The videos parodied by Jedward include "SOS" by the Jonas Brothers, "Single Ladies (Put a Ring on It)" by Beyoncé, "Telephone" by Lady Gaga, and "...Baby One More Time" by Britney Spears. The video was given its first television airplay by 4Music on July 16, 2010. Since its premiere, the video has more than 2 million views on YouTube.

Charts

Release history

In popular culture
"All the Small Things" was used in 1999 in the TV show Buffy the Vampire Slayer  (season 4, episode 9 - "Something Blue") before it was released on CD, and in Boston Legal (season 1, episode 14 - "Til We Meat Again"). The song is played during the end credits of the 2000 film, Charlie's Angels. It can be heard in the trailer for Alvin and the Chipmunks and in the 2000 film Archibald the Koala: The Movie and the 2002 film Clockstoppers, and is also present on its soundtrack. Alvin and the Chipmunks covered the song for their 2008 album Undeniable. The song has been used frequently in music video games; "All the Small Things" is a playable track in Guitar Hero 5, Guitar Hero: On Tour, and Guitar Hero Live. It appears as downloadable content for Rock Band on consoles, further appearing in Rock Band Track Pack Volume 1 and Rock Band's iOS port. Covers are present in the video games Rock Revolution, Donkey Konga, and Alvin and the Chipmunks.

When originally released, the song was performed on Saturday Night Live along with "What's My Age Again?" on January 8, 2000, on the season 25 episode hosted by Jamie Foxx. As a testament to the song's lasting popular impact, it was performed on The Tonight Show with Jay Leno twice: first on October 15, 1999, and second after Blink 182's reformation on May 19, 2009. In The Simpsons episode "Barting Over" the song is played along with the appearance of the band themselves at the scene where Bart encounters a skateboard hall. A British television series named after the song was broadcast on BBC One in the United Kingdom in 2009. In Family Guy'''s "It's a Trap!", Han Solo (Peter Griffin) can be heard singing the song after C-3PO (Glenn Quagmire) states the Ewoks "Seem to think I'm some sort of god.", to which Peter exclaims "And they seem to think I'm Sum 41!" before proceeding to enthusiastically sing the first line of "All the Small Things", much to the chagrin of Luke Skywalker (Chris Griffin).

An advertising campaign by Dunkin' was seen in fall of 2020, seemingly utilizing the song's title in their signage with the phrase, "All The Fall Things".  Fans saw the pun as a reference to the band, and a testament to the enduring popularity of the song.  An article from iHeartRadio pointed out the song's continued place in pop culture and marketing campaigns by saying, "'All The Small Things' may have come out more than 20 years ago, but it's certainly made a resurgence in 2020. Earlier this year, the song was featured in a BMW commercial, now Dunkin Donuts is using the title for a punny marketing campaign to promote its fall menu."  The band's official Facebook account reposted an image of the sign, with the caption "we [see] you Dunkin'".

Starting in 2019, the NHL team the Colorado Avalanche began playing the song during the third period of home games with a comfortable lead and after overtime wins. While the song plays, the audio is cut out during the chorus to allow fans in the arena to sing along, in a manner similar to their division rival St. Louis Blues with Take Me Home, Country Roads. On May 5, 2022, Hoppus acknowledged the Avalanche's tradition on Twitter, calling it "amazing". The tradition has gained more prominence as the 2021–22 team won the Stanley Cup final. The Athletic's book about the 2021-22 team was titled Carry Me Home'', a lyric from the song's refrain.

The 2022 John Lewis Christmas advert features a cover of the song by Postmodern Jukebox.

References

 
 

1999 singles
1999 songs
2010 singles
American power pop songs
Blink-182 songs
Colorado Avalanche
Cultural depictions of Britney Spears
Jedward songs
MCA Records singles
Music videos directed by Marcos Siega
Songs written by Mark Hoppus
Songs written by Tom DeLonge
Universal Music Group singles